Stinesville Commercial Historic District is a national historic district located at Stinesville, Monroe County, Indiana.  The district consists of five adjoining limestone commercial buildings in the central business district of Stinesville.  The buildings were built between 1886 and 1894, and display elements of Renaissance Revival and Romanesque Revival style architecture.  The main building is the two-story, Oolitic Lodge No. 682, I.O.O.F. built in 1894.

It was listed on the National Register of Historic Places in 1995.

References

Historic districts on the National Register of Historic Places in Indiana
Commercial buildings on the National Register of Historic Places in Indiana
Romanesque Revival architecture in Indiana
Renaissance Revival architecture in Indiana
Buildings and structures in Monroe County, Indiana
Historic districts in Monroe County, Indiana
National Register of Historic Places in Monroe County, Indiana